Nigrovothelium is a genus of lichen-forming fungi in the family Trypetheliaceae. It has three species. The genus was circumscribed in 2016 by lichenologists Robert Lücking, Matthew Nelsen, and André Aptroot, to contain species formerly in the Trypethelium tropicum species group. The type species, Nigrovothelium tropicum, was originally described by Erik Acharius in 1810, as a species of Verrucaria.

The genus can be characterised by its differences from other similar Trypetheliaceae genera. It differs from Astrothelium in that it has ascomata that are black, fully exposed, and sessile. It differs from Bathelium in its mostly single, black ascomata and astrothelioid ascospores. It differs from Polymeridium in its  thallus and astrothelioid ascospores.

Species
 Nigrovothelium bullatum 
 Nigrovothelium inspersotropicum 
 Nigrovothelium tropicum''

References

Trypetheliaceae
Dothideomycetes genera
Lichen genera
Taxa described in 2016
Taxa named by André Aptroot
Taxa named by Robert Lücking